Eight ships of the Royal Navy have borne the name HMS Andromeda, after the Greek heroine Andromeda.

 was a 28-gun sixth rate launched in 1777 and lost in a hurricane in 1780.
 was a 32-gun fifth rate launched in 1784, placed on harbour service from 1808 and broken up in 1811.
 was a 24-gun sixth rate, previously the American Hannibal. She was captured in 1812 and sold in 1816.
HMS Andromeda was to have been a sixth rate. She was renamed  in 1827 before being launched in 1828.
 was a 46-gun fifth rate launched in 1829 and sold in 1863.
 was a  launched in 1897. She later served as a depot and training ship, being renamed HMS Powerful II in 1913, HMS Impregnable II in 1919 and HMS Defiance in 1931. She was broken up in 1956.
 was an  sloop launched in 1917 for service with the French Navy under the name Andromede.
 was a  launched in 1967. She was sold to the Indian Navy in 1995 and commissioned as Krishna.

Royal Navy ship names